Chryseobacterium balustinum  is a bacterium from the genus of Chryseobacterium which has been isolated from blood from a fish in Lausanne in Switzerland.

References

Further reading

External links
Type strain of Chryseobacterium balustinum at BacDive -  the Bacterial Diversity Metadatabase

balustinum
Bacteria described in 1994